Sandy Neck Cultural Resources District is a historic district in Barnstable, Massachusetts.  Sandy Neck is a long spit of land extending east–west on the northern shore of the lower portion of Cape Cod, sheltering Barnstable Harbor.  This area has a fairly lengthy history of human occupation, including archaeological prehistoric and colonial historic resources.  Archaeological research in the 1960s identified shell middens dating from the pre-contact Woodland Period.

The district was added to the National Register of Historic Places in 1987.

See also
National Register of Historic Places listings in Barnstable County, Massachusetts

References

Historic districts in Barnstable County, Massachusetts
Barnstable, Massachusetts
National Register of Historic Places in Barnstable, Massachusetts
Historic districts on the National Register of Historic Places in Massachusetts